The 2012 Wolverine–Hoosier Athletic Conference women's basketball tournament is the 2012 post-season tournament for Wolverine–Hoosier Athletic Conference, an NAIA Division II athletic conferences.

Format
Out of the league's 10 teams, the top eight receive berths in the conference tournament.  After the 18-game conference season, teams are seeded by conference record.

Bracket

References

Wolverine–Hoosier Athletic Conference basketball